Bergtrollus dzimbowski is a species of tardigrades.

The genus name Bergtrollus is named after the mythical Scandinavian "mountain troll" (berg meaning "mountain" in Norwegian, German, etc.).  The species name is in honor of Hans-Jochen Dzimbowski, a friend and guide of the discoverer of the species, Hieronymus Dastych.

References

Apochela
Tardigrade genera
Monotypic protostome genera